Tao Miaofa was a Chinese diplomat. He was Ambassador of the People's Republic of China to Albania (1993–1996), Slovakia (1996–1999) and Bulgaria (1999–2003).

References

Ambassadors of China to Albania
Ambassadors of China to Slovakia
Ambassadors of China to Bulgaria
Living people
Year of birth missing (living people)